The Park Plaza Westminster Bridge is a hotel at 200 Westminster Bridge Road in London with 1,019 bedrooms.

It was designed by BUJ architects, Uri Blumenthal architects and Digital Space, and was built on the site of the County Hall Island Block, an annex of London County Hall, that was demolished in 2006. The building, also known as No 1 Westminster Bridge Road, had been disused since 1986 and had become derelict, being described by the BBC as "one of London's most hated eyesores".

The hotel opened on 1 March 2010 and cost £300 million. It is part of the PPHE Hotel Group.

References

External links

 Hotel at Park Plaza Hotels & Resorts

Buildings and structures in the London Borough of Lambeth
Hotels in London
Park Plaza Hotels & Resorts
PPHE Hotel Group hotels
Hotels established in 2010
Hotel buildings completed in 2010